Eremophila maitlandii, commonly known as Shark Bay poverty bush, is a flowering plant in the figwort family, Scrophulariaceae and is endemic to Western Australia. It is a silvery-grey shrub with linear leaves and lilac-coloured to light purple flowers and is common in coastal areas between Shark Bay and Carnarvon.

Description
Its branches and leaves are covered with a layer of grey or yellowish branched hairs.

The petal tube is lilac-coloured to purple on the outside and lighter with faint lilac spots inside. The petal tube and lobes are mostly glabrous except that the inside of the tube is filled with long, soft hairs. The 4 stamens are fully enclosed in the petal tube.

Taxonomy and naming
Eremophila maitlandii was first formally described in 1870 by botanist George Bentham in Flora Australiensis.
The specific epithet (maitlandii) honours Maitland Brown.

Distribution and habitat
Shark Bay poverty bush is common between Shark Bay and Carnarvon, often growing on coastal sand dunes but grows inland as far as the Kennedy Range in the Carnarvon, Gascoyne, Geraldton Sandplains, Murchison and Yalgoo biogeographic regions.

Conservation status
Eremophila maitlandii is classified as "not threatened" by the Western Australian Government Department of Parks and Wildlife.

Use in horticulture
The tall open habit, and grey-green foliage contrasting with pale blue to lilac flowers are features of this eremophila. Specimens propagated from cuttings have been grown in southern Queensland but more success has been achieved in southern Australia with grafting onto Myoporum rootstock. It grows best in well-drained soil in full sun, is moderately drought resistant but is sometimes damaged by severe frosts.

References

maitlandii
Eudicots of Western Australia
Endemic flora of Western Australia
Plants described in 1870
Taxa named by George Bentham